La Cappella Madonna della Grazia is a historic church building in Gioi, Italy.

History 
La Cappella Madonna della Grazia was the private family chapel for the Salati family of Gioi, Italy. The chapel was built about 1600, and during renovations it was discovered that the original owners were the De Marco family, also of Gioi. The chapel fell into disuse in the 1800s and now is owned by the government of Italy. The roof has been restored, but the interior requires substantial renovation.

See also 
 Chapel
 Christianity in Italy
 Religion in Italy

References

External links 
 La Cappella Madonna della Grazia on Findagrave

Chapels in Italy
Churches in the province of Salerno
17th-century Roman Catholic church buildings in Italy